Tulsa shooting may refer to:
 Tulsa race massacre, in 1921
 Shooting of Terence Crutcher, an unarmed black man killed by police in 2016
 Shooting of Carlos Carson, another unarmed Black man killed by a private security guard in 2020
 2022 Tulsa hospital shooting